The Edward J. Berwind House is a mansion located on 2 East 64th Street and Fifth Avenue in the Upper East Side in New York City.

It was constructed in 1886 for the coal baron Edward J. Berwind. It served as headquarters for the American Heart Association until 1978 when it was reconverted to residential use with a new penthouse.

See also
The Elms (Newport, Rhode Island), Berwind's summer mansion

References

Further reading 
 

Fifth Avenue
Upper East Side
Houses in Manhattan
Houses completed in 1886
1886 establishments in New York (state)